Tak Sun Secondary School (TSSS; traditional Chinese: 德信中學; demonym: Tak Sun Boy) is a directly subsidized, English as Medium of Instruction, boys' school located at Tai Shui Hang, Ma On Shan, Sha Tin, New Territories, Hong Kong. The institution was established in 2000.

Tak Sun is founded on Catholic Christian values, incorporates the involvement of parents in the education of their children and encourages their own personal growth as parents.

History
In March 2006, the school invited a comprehensive review of its activities by the Faculty of Education of the University of Hong Kong. The resulting report was generally positive, but identified deficiencies in academic rigour that required addressing.

School facilities
The school has a multimedia learning center, student activity center, a comprehensive learning center, language rooms, auditorium, laboratories, computer rooms, a library, a fitness room, football court, handball court, basketball court, badminton courts, athletics track and a small church.

References

External links

Secondary schools in Hong Kong
Direct Subsidy Scheme schools
Boys' schools in Hong Kong
Tai Shui Hang